{{Infobox radio station
| name                = WLNK
| logo                = File:Mix 107.9 Charlotte 2021.png
| city                = Charlotte, North Carolina
| area                = Charlotte/Metrolina
| branding            = Mix 107.9
| frequency           =  
| airdate             =  (as WBT-FM)
| language            = English
| format              = Hot adult contemporary
| subchannels         = HD1: WLNK analogHD2: Talk (WBT)HD3: Sports (WFNZ-FM)
| erp                 =  (analog)
 (digital)
| haat                = 
| class               = C
| licensing_authority = FCC
| facility_id         = 30834
| coordinates         = 
| callsign_meaning    = W LiNK (former branding)
| former_callsigns    = WBT-FM (1962–78)WBCY (1978–89)WBT-FM (1989–95)WWSN (1995–97)
| sister_stations     = 
| owner               = Urban One
| licensee            = Radio One of North Carolina, LLC
| operator            =
| webcast             = 
| website             =  
}}

WLNK (107.9 FM) is a commercial radio station licensed to serve Charlotte, North Carolina. The station is owned by Urban One. WLNK broadcasts a hot adult contemporary radio format. WLNK broadcasts using HD Radio.http://www.freqseek.com/NC/Charlotte/hd-radio-stations.aspx?page=1 List of Freqseek HD stations in Charlotte-Gastonia-Rock Hill

History
WBT-FM
WBT-FM was first heard on the 107.9 frequency on August 15, 1962, but this was actually the second incarnation of WBT-FM. Those call letters were used on WBT's first FM service at 99.9 MHz from 1947 to 1954. Clyde McLean was the original announcer on WBT-FM, and the station was purposed for "Storecasting" or playing background music for businesses in the Charlotte area. Very little advertising was sold on the station, and the company's television station, WBTV was becoming profitable for the company. For that reason, Jefferson Standard Broadcasting Company decided to abandon WBT-FM.

The station's broadcasting equipment was donated to the University of North Carolina at Chapel Hill, which then started a non-commercial station, WUNC-FM.

Jefferson Standard Broadcasting Company returned to FM broadcasting in 1962. The station at 107.9 was one of the first FM stereo stations in the nation. Initially, the station aired a mixture of classical music and beautiful music, but by the mid-1960s, WBT-FM was airing the beautiful music format produced by Schulke Radio Productions.

WBCY
On August 31, 1978, at 6 p.m., WBT-FM   became "WBCY-108, Charlotte's Best Rock". According to an ad appearing in the September 1, 1978 edition of The Charlotte Observer, WBCY played 108 hours of music uninterrupted by commercials. Artists played included Chicago, Peter Frampton, The Rolling Stones, Carly Simon, Billy Joel, and Eddie Money. Popular announcers on the station during this time included John Lambis, Chris Jones, Alan Ryan, Becky Kent and Fred Story. Over the next 11 years, the station moved back and forth between adult-leaning CHR and high-energy adult contemporary.

Also in 1978, Marty Lambert became Jeff Pilot, the traffic reporter for WBT and WBCY. Lambert became assistant program director and music director in 1982.

In the early '80s, WBCY hired Johnny Ray Isley as morning host, and later added Billy James as co-host. After John Boy accepted Jesus, he eventually decided he was being asked to play inappropriate songs, and he quit WBCY in February 1986. Bob Lacey, a veteran announcer for WBT and WBTV, replaced John Boy temporarily. Jim "Catfish" Prewitt also paired with Billy, who left the station in April. Later in 1986, Randy Cook and Spiff Dingle became the new morning hosts, while John Boy and Billy went to work for WRFX.

WBCY was also the home of popular Contemporary Christian music program, "Visions", hosted by Ken Mayfield. The program aired every Sunday morning from 1985 until 1993, when Mayfield left to manage WRCM.

When the North Carolina Tar Heels and the NBA Charlotte Hornets played at the same time, WBCY aired the Hornets.

In December 1988, Randy and Spiff were fired because WBCY intended to move toward "a more adult-oriented sound" under the new moniker "B108"; they became the morning hosts at WFOX in Atlanta.Jeff Borden, "Country WSOC's Lead Grows," The Charlotte Observer, January 28, 1989, p. 7B.  The change also cost DJ J.J. McKay his job, so McKay went to work for WCKZ; WBCY sought to enforce a noncompete clause, but it was ruled the contract that included the clause had expired before McKay was let go. Program director Mary June Rose hired Rob Early for the morning show in March 1989.

Sunny 107.9
In November 1989, WBCY announced that Bob Lacey would be the station's morning host starting December 11. That same month, WBCY returned to the WBT-FM call letters and changed its format to mainstream adult contemporary under the moniker "Sunny 107.9". Sheri Lynch joined Lacey in February 1992, forming the current "Bob & Sheri" show, which began syndication in 1996 and is now heard on about 70 stations. Syndication of WLNK's programming was handled by Westwood One and later NOW! Media.

Eventually, the station's music began leaning in a top 40 direction again.

In 1995, Jefferson-Pilot purchased WBZK-FM, licensed to Chester, South Carolina, and flipped it to a simulcast of WBT to reach more listeners west of Charlotte at night due nighttime signal issues. As a result, the WBT-FM call letters went to that station, while 107.9 FM became WWSN.  On August 23, 1996, the station changed its moniker to "Hits 107.9."

107.9 the Link
On March 14, 1997, after a brief stunt with construction sounds, the station flipped to modern adult contemporary, branded as "107.9 the Link".Bill Keveney, "Radio Wrap," The Charlotte Observer, December 13, 1998. The current WLNK call letters would be adopted the following day. The modern AC format lasted only a few years, and the station returned to a more mainstream sound, best described as "adult top 40".

Matt Harris and Ramona Holloway joined WLNK as afternoon hosts on March 19, 2001. They met in Columbus, Ohio and worked in Virginia Beach, Virginia before coming to Charlotte. After The Matt and Ramona Show became the top show with women 25-54, Matt & Ramona became nationally syndicated starting in 2004. The show won "Best Radio Show" in Charlotte Magazine'' several times.

That same year, Pam Stone began hosting a midday talk show, which meant WLNK was lifestyle talk during the day on weekdays with music at night and on weekends. Stone's show later moved to weekends before the station ended it. Kelly McKay took over middays in 2009 and departed in 2014. Followed by Kelly Meyers in the midday slot, she began in February 2015, and was let go in December 2019.

In 2006, Philadelphia-based Lincoln Financial Group acquired Jefferson-Pilot (including the broadcasting division). Lincoln Financial began to liquidate its broadcasting assets. Greater Media acquired WLNK, along with sister stations WBT and WBT-FM, for $100 million in a deal which was finalized on January 31, 2008. Raycom Media Inc. was buying WBTV separately.

Starting with the 2015-16 season, WLNK aired any Tar Heels games that WBT couldn't air—for instance, whenever the Carolina Panthers were airing on WBT.

In July 2016, WLNK tweaked its format towards mainstream AC and changed their slogan to "Charlotte's Best Mix."

On July 19, 2016, Greater Media announced that they would merge with Beasley Media Group. Because Beasley is already maxed out in the Charlotte market with 5 FM's and 2 AM's, WLNK and WBT AM/FM were to be spun off to a divesture trust, eventually going to a permanent buyer. On October 18, 2016, Entercom announced that they would purchase WLNK and WBT AM/FM, plus WFNZ, pending FCC approval. Upon the completion of the Greater/Beasley merger on November 1, Entercom began operating the stations via a time brokerage agreement, which lasted until the sale was consummated on January 10, 2017.

On November 5, 2020, Urban One agreed to a station swap with Entercom in which they would swap ownership of four stations in Philadelphia, St. Louis and Washington, D.C. to Entercom in exchange for their cluster of Charlotte stations, including WLNK. As part of the terms of the deal, Urban One took over operations via a local marketing agreement on November 23. The swap was consummated on April 20, 2021.

Mix 107.9
In April 2021, Urban One announced they would drop Bob and Sheri from WLNK. Lacey and Lynch's company, NOW! Media,  which bought the show from Entercom in 2017, will continue to distribute the show, and will continue to air on their nationwide affiliates. (The show was picked up locally by WKQC the following month.) In addition, Brent ‘O’Brien’ Harlan was let go as producer and third-mic of the "Matt & Ramona" show after 18 years at the station.

On April 30, 2021, at 3 p.m., WLNK relaunched as "Mix 107.9". The first song on "Mix" was This Is How We Do It by Montell Jordan. Matt & Ramona moved to mornings, with Drew Parham hosting middays, Madison James hosting afternoons with DJ Baby Yu on the mix at 5PM and Holly Haze hosting evenings. Martha Landess of Urban One described the format as an "upbeat mix of music from the '90s, 2000s and today".

As part of Major League Soccer expansion team Charlotte FC's deal with Urban One’s Charlotte cluster, WLNK airs any Charlotte FC matches whenever both WFNZ-FM and WBT have a conflict. This first happened during Charlotte FC’s inaugural home match, since WFNZ was airing a Charlotte Hornets game and WBT was airing a North Carolina Tar Heels basketball game.

References

External links

Hot adult contemporary radio stations in the United States
LNK
Urban One stations
LNK
Radio stations established in 1961